Cyclopteropsis is a genus of marine ray-finned fishes belonging to the family Cyclopteridae, the lumpfishes or lumpsuckers. These small lumpfishes are found in the North Pacific and Arctic Oceans.

Taxonomy
Cyclopteropsis was first proposed as a genus in 1929 by the Russian ichthyologists Vladimir Konstantinovich Soldatov and Alexander Mikhailovich Popov designating Cyclopteropsis bergi as the type species. FishBase still recognises this genus as valid, but Catalog of Fishes treats it as a synonym of Eumicrotremus.

Species
There are currently seven recognized species in this genus:
 Cyclopteropsis bergi Popov, 1929
 Cyclopteropsis brashnikowi (P. J. Schmidt, 1904)
 Cyclopteropsis inarmatus Mednikov (ru) & Prokhorov, 1956 (Bumpy lumpsucker)
 Cyclopteropsis jordani Soldatov, 1929 (Smooth lumpfish)
 Cyclopteropsis lindbergi Soldatov, 1930
 Cyclopteropsis mcalpini (Fowler, 1914) (Arctic lumpsucker)
 Cyclopteropsis popovi Soldatov, 1929

References

Cyclopteridae
 
Taxa named by Vladimir Soldatov
Taxa described in 1929